Am Mellensee is a municipality in the Teltow-Fläming district of Brandenburg, Germany. The municipality, south of Berlin, is the home of the Benedictine Abbey of St. Gertrud. An Associated Press story appearing in the August 1, 2011 online version of the St. Louis Post-Dispatch detailed the breadmaking there. The nuns make Communion wafers for eastern Germany's Catholics, including those in the Berlin area, and some Lutheran communities. They will provide the bread for the Communion wafers during the Eucharist for Papal Masses at Erfurt's Cathedral and in Berlin's Olympic Stadium to be celebrated by Pope Benedict XVI for his September 2011 visit to Germany, his third visit as Pope.

Demography

References

Localities in Teltow-Fläming
Teltow (region)